"Manifest Destiny/Sorority Tears" is a combination of two clips from different songs by American alternative rock band Guster. After "Manifest Destiny" ends, it very softly slides right into "Sorority Tears", which begins with a soft banjo opening featuring a harmonica.  This gives it a "bluesy" feel, but then the song escalates slightly into a louder section featuring horns and a louder drum piece before softly fading back to the same type of music as the opening.

Originally, "Sorority Tears" was supposed to be included as a separate song, either as a b-side or an album song, but the record company didn't like the overall difference in style of the piece, so the band simply decided to combine the two songs into one. In the band's own words, "By putting a slash in the title and cross-fading the music, we got our record label to agree to pretend it was just one song."

"Manifest Destiny" was later released on the band's 2006 album Ganging Up On The Sun, but "Sorority Tears" didn't make the final cut.

References

2006 songs
Guster songs